In the theory of formal languages, the Myhill–Nerode theorem provides a necessary and sufficient condition for a language to be regular. The theorem is named for John Myhill and Anil Nerode, who proved it at the University of Chicago in 1957 .

Statement
It is easy to show that  is an equivalence relation on strings, and thus it divides the set of all strings into  equivalence classes.

The Myhill–Nerode theorem states that a language  is regular if and only if  has a finite number of equivalence classes, and moreover, that this number is equal to the number of states in the minimal deterministic finite automaton (DFA) accepting . Furthermore, every minimal DFA for the language is isomorphic to the canonical one .

Generally, for any language, the constructed automaton is a state automaton acceptor. However, it does not necessarily have finitely many states. The Myhill–Nerode theorem shows that finiteness is necessary and sufficient for language regularity.

Some authors refer to the  relation as Nerode congruence, in honor of Anil Nerode.

Use and consequences
This may be done by an exhaustive case analysis in which, beginning from the empty string, distinguishing extensions are used to find additional equivalence classes until no more can be found. For example, the language consisting of binary representations of numbers that can be divided by 3 is regular. The minimal automaton accepting our language would have three states corresponding to these three equivalence classes.

Another immediate corollary of the theorem is that if for a language  the relation  has infinitely many equivalence classes, it is  regular.  It is this corollary that is frequently used to prove that a language is not regular.

Generalizations 
The Myhill–Nerode theorem can be generalized to tree automata.

See also 
Pumping lemma for regular languages, an alternative method for proving that a language is not regular. The pumping lemma may not always be able to prove that a language is not regular.
Syntactic monoid

References 

.
.
. ASTIA Document No. AD 155741.
.

Further reading

Formal languages
Theorems in discrete mathematics
Finite automata